Naratriptan (trade names include Amerge) is a triptan drug marketed by GlaxoSmithKline and is used for the treatment of migraine headaches. It is a selective 5-HT1 receptor subtype agonist.

It was patented in 1987 and approved for medical use in 1997.

Medical uses
Naratriptan is used for the treatment of the acute migraine attacks and the symptoms of migraine, including severe, throbbing headaches that sometimes are accompanied by nausea and sensitivity to sound or light.

Efficacy
A meta-analysis of 53 clinical trials has shown that all triptans are effective for treating migraine at marketed doses and that naratriptan, although less effective than sumatriptan and rizatriptan was more effective than placebo in reducing migraine symptoms at two hours and efficacy was demonstrated in almost two thirds of subjects after four hours of treatment.

Side effects

Side effects include: dizziness, drowsiness, tingling of the hands or feet, nausea, dry mouth and unsteadiness. If these effects persist or worsen, notify your doctor promptly. Side-effects which are unlikely and which should be promptly reported include: chest pain/pressure, throat pain/pressure, unusually fast/slow/irregular pulse, one-sided muscle weakness, vision problems, cold/bluish hands or feet, stomach pain, bloody diarrhea, mental/mood changes, and fainting. In the unlikely event you have a serious allergic reaction to this drug, seek immediate medical attention. Symptoms of a serious allergic reaction include: rash, itching, swelling, severe dizziness, trouble breathing (swelling of the throat).

Mechanism of action

The causes of migraine are not clearly understood; however, the efficacy of naratriptans and other triptans is believed to be due to their activity as 5-HT (serotonin) agonists.

Society and culture
In the United States, the Food and Drug Administration (FDA) approved naratriptan on February 11, 1998.

In July 2010, in the wake of the patent expiration, several drug manufacturers, including Roxane Labs, Sandoz and Teva Pharmaceuticals, announced that they were launching generic Naratriptan medications.

The drug continued to be covered by European patent 0303507 in Germany, Spain, France and the United Kingdom through March 10, 2012, and by Australian patent 611469 in Australia through June 17, 2013.  It had previously been covered by Canadian patent 1210968; but both Sandoz and Teva (formerly Novopharm) have offered generic equivalents in Canada since that patent's expiration December 1, 2009.

On December 23, 2014, in response to a request from Health Canada, importers in Canada agreed to quarantine the importation of health products, including generic Naratriptan manufactured for both Sandoz and Teva, from Dr. Reddy's Laboratories in Srikakulam, India. Because Teva and Sandoz are the only approved suppliers of generic Naratriptan in Canada, the quarantine resulted in Naratriptan being placed on the Canadian drug shortage list.

Following the Canadian quarantine, the United Arab Emirates' Ministry of Health also imposed a similar quarantine.

References 

Triptans
Piperidines
Sulfonamides
GSK plc brands
5-HT1D agonists
5-HT1F agonists